Hardin is an unincorporated community in Clayton County, Iowa, United States.

Hardin was surveyed in 1854.

References

Unincorporated communities in Clayton County, Iowa
Unincorporated communities in Iowa
1854 establishments in Iowa
Populated places established in 1854